Noël Tijou (born 12 December 1941) is a French long-distance runner. He competed in the men's 10,000 metres at the 1972 Summer Olympics.

References

1941 births
Living people
Athletes (track and field) at the 1972 Summer Olympics
French male long-distance runners
Olympic athletes of France
Place of birth missing (living people)